Aaron Cohen (born September 28, 1981) is an American former judoka.  He was a 5-time US national champion (2004, 2005, 2006, 2008, and 2009), and earned a silver medal in the 2008 US Olympic trials. He earned a bronze medal at the 2009 Maccabiah Games in Israel.

Biography
He is the son of Irwin Cohen, a former Olympian, is Jewish, and lives in Buffalo Grove, Illinois. Aaron's uncle Steve Cohen is a former Olympic competitor and coach, and his brother Richard also competed at the national level.

He trained at the New York Athletic Club.

He was a 5-time US national champion (2004, 2005, 2006, 2008, and 2009), and placed second 4 times, and third once. He earned a silver medal in the 2008 US Olympic trials. 

Aaron Cohen won silver at the 2003 Pan American Championships, and bronze at the 2000, 2005, 2006, and 2007 Pan American Judo Championships. He also competed in four Judo World Championships.  

Cohen competed for Team USA at the 2009 Maccabiah Games in Israel, earning a bronze medal. 

Cohen is currently a coach at Deerfield High School in Deerfield, Illinois.

References

External links
Twitter page

1981 births
Living people
American male judoka
Competitors at the 2009 Maccabiah Games
Jewish American sportspeople
Jewish martial artists
Maccabiah Games bronze medalists for the United States
Maccabiah Games medalists in judo
People from Buffalo Grove, Illinois
Sportspeople from Cook County, Illinois
21st-century American Jews